Henri Bonnart, a French painter and engraver, was the brother of Robert, Jean Baptiste, and Nicolas Bonnart. He was born in Paris in 1642, became rector of the Academy of St. Luke, and died in Paris in 1711. Le Blanc attributes to him 201 plates, of which 20 are religious subjects, 46 portraits, and 1S5 costume prints. His son, Jean Baptiste Henri Bonnart, followed his father's profession, and died in 1726, aged about 48 years. In Perrault's 'Cabinet des Beaux- Arts,' published in Paris in 1690, there is a plate of a ceiling ornamented with figures, which is probably by him; it is etched in a free, masterly style, finished with the graver, and marked Jean Bonnart, Junior, del. et sculpt.

Gallery

References
 

1642 births
1711 deaths
17th-century French engravers
18th-century French engravers
17th-century French painters
French male painters
18th-century French painters
Painters from Paris
18th-century French male artists